Estimata is a genus of moths of the family Noctuidae.

Species
Estimata alexis Kozhantschikov, 1928
Estimata cacumena  (Brandt, 1938)
Estimata clavata  (Hampson, 1907)
Estimata dailingensis  Chen, 1984
Estimata dhaulagirii  Dierl, 1983
Estimata eversti  Dierl, 1983
Estimata herrichschaefferi  (Alpheraky, 1895)
Estimata herzioides  (Corti & Draudt, 1933)
Estimata magadanica  Kononenko, 1981
Estimata militzae  (Kozhantschikov, 1937)
Estimata oschi  (Kozhantschikov, 1937)
Estimata parvula  (Alpheraky, 1897)
Estimata takkhalii  Dierl, 1983
Estimata tibetophasma  Boursin, 1963

References

External links
Natural History Museum Lepidoptera genus database

Noctuinae